Roscommon County Council is the authority responsible for local government in County Roscommon, Ireland. As a county council, it is governed by the Local Government Act 2001. The council is responsible for housing and community, roads and transportation, urban planning and development, amenity and culture, and environment. The council has 18 elected members. Elections are held every five years and are by single transferable vote. The head of the council has the title of Cathaoirleach (Chairperson). The county administration is headed by a Chief Executive, Eugene Cummins. The county town is Roscommon.

History
Originally Roscommon County Council held its meetings in Roscommon Courthouse. The county council moved to a new facility, known as County Hall, in December 2015.

Local Electoral Areas and Municipal Districts
Roscommon County Council is divided into the following municipal districts and local electoral areas, defined by electoral divisions.

Councillors

2019 seats summary

Councillors by electoral area
This list reflects the order in which councillors were elected on 24 May 2019.

Notes

Co-options

References

External links

Politics of County Roscommon
County councils in the Republic of Ireland